David Magnier (30 October 1915 – 10 July 1979) is an Irish sportsperson. He played Gaelic football with his local club Fermoy and was a member of the Cork senior inter-county team from 1944 until 1947.

Career

Magnier first came to Gaelic football prominence as a 17-year-old member of the Fermoy team that claimed the County Intermediate Championship title in 1932. This victory saw him join the Cork minor team in 1933. A stint with the Cork junior team was followed by a call-up to the Cork senior team in 1943. Magnier collected a Munster Championship in his first year with the team, however, it would be 1945 before he joined the starting fifteen. He won his second provincial medal that year before ending the season by lining out at right corner-back when Cork claimed the All-Ireland title after a defeat of Cavan in the final. Magnier ended the year by winning a County Senior Championship medal with Fermoy. He also won a Railway Cup medal with Munster.

Personal life and death

Born in Fermoy, County Cork, Magnier was the son of John Magnier who had played with Fermoy and Cork at the turn of the 20th century. A carpenter by trade, he worked with Ford's in Cork. Magnier died after a period of ill health at the Regional Hospital in Cork on 10 July 1979. He was the seventh member of Cork's 1945 All-Ireland-winning team to die.

Honours

Fermoy
Cork Senior Football Championship: 1945
Cork Intermediate Football Championship: 1932

Cork
All-Ireland Senior Football Championship: 1945
Munster Senior Football Championship: 1943, 1945

Munster
Railway Cup: 1946

References

1915 births
1979 deaths
Fermoy Gaelic footballers
Cork inter-county Gaelic footballers
Munster inter-provincial Gaelic footballers